Prison Romance is a 1993 Russian drama film directed by Yevgeni Tatarsky.

Plot 
The film tells the story of a female investigator who falls in love with a criminal, whose case she is being conducting, and helps him to escape.

Cast 
 Aleksandr Abdulov as Artynov
 Yury Kuznetsov as Yuri Kuznetsov
 Aristarkh Livanov as Aristarkh Livanov
 Marina Neyolova as Elena Andreevna
 Boris Sokolov as Boris Sokolov

References

External links 
 

1993 films
1990s Russian-language films
Russian drama films
1993 drama films